Discount Fireworks is the first compilation by Over the Rhine, released in 2007.  It was the band's final release for Back Porch Records, the label for which they had been recording since 2000.

The album contains 14 previously released songs and a 2006 recording of "Last Night On Earth Again," an unreleased song from the Ohio sessions.

Track listing

 "Last Night on Earth Again" (Detweiler) – 3:35
 "If Nothing Else" (Detweiler) – 4:57
 "Suitcase" (Bergquist, Detweiler) – 3:27
 "Give Me Strength" (Armstrong, Gabriel, Statham) – 4:15
 "Latter Days" (Detweiler) – 5:42
 "The World Can Wait" (Bergquist, Detweiler) – 5:46
 "Show Me" (Bergquist, Detweiler) – 4:21
 "Born" (Bergquist, Detweiler) – 6:15
 "All I Need Is Everything" (Bergquist, Detweiler) – 5:-4
 "Ohio" (Bergquist) – 5:14
 "Sleep Baby Jane" (Detweiler, Hordinski) – 5:01
 "How Does It Feel? (To Be on My Mind)" (Detweiler, Hordinski) – 3:56
 "Lookin’ Forward" (Bergquist, Detweiler) – 4:11
 "Within Without" (Detweiler, Hordinski) – 4:28
 "Like a Radio" (Detweiler, Hordinski) – 5:04

Personnel 

Evan Adler – product manager
Devon Ashley – drums
Michael Aukafor – dulcimer
Mike Bailey – A&R
Karin Bergquist – piano, vocals, producer
Owen Brock – design
Linford Detweiler – acoustic guitar, bass, guitar, keyboards, organ (hammond), producer, liner notes, drum loop, loop, cello arrangement, tack piano
Pascal Gabriel – keyboards, programming, loop
Mickey Grimm – percussion, drums
Don Heffington – percussion, drums
Jack Henderson – guitar, electric guitar, lap steel guitar
Peter Hicks – electric guitar
Ric Hordinski – guitar, mandolin, producer
Byron House – bass
Norman Johns – cello
Brad Jones – acoustic guitar, bass, electric guitar, producer
Brian Kelley – percussion, drums
Paul Mahern – producer
Mickey Paoletta – pedal steel, slide guitar
Dave Perkins – guitar, producer
Rick Plant – electric guitar
Vess Ruhtenberg – electric guitar
Will Sayles – percussion, drums
Kim Taylor – acoustic guitar, harmony
Jason Wilbur – electric guitar
Michael "Mick" Wilson – photography

References

Over the Rhine (band) albums
2007 compilation albums